Radzilowski can refer to:
 John Radzilowski
 Thaddeus Radzilowski